Siti Kamaluddin is the first female director in Brunei Darussalam  who is also considered to be one of the 50 Most influential women Brunei in Brunei Darussalam (2014). She has had a wealth of experience on screen and behind the scenes. She began her career as a writer and TV host in Brunei Darussalam and later started directing and producing for on TV shows.

Early life
Siti Kamaluddin was born on 1 December  1979 in Bandar Seri Begawan.  After graduating high school at Downe House School in the UK, she proceeded to study chemistry at the University of Southampton. However, she realised that her passion for films surpasses her love for Chemistry and decided to venture into the film industry. Siti began her entertainment career on screen- as a TV Host for Orange room.

Career
Siti then set up Origin Artistic Management, the leading production company in Brunei, where she produced and directed TV Commercials and documentaries for some of Brunei's largest corporate clients. Siti Kamaluddin has also received the Special Award for Outstanding Contribution to the Music Industry from her earlier works.

She later directed her film Mentari where six directors from ASEAN countries made an anthology of film to celebrate International Women's Day 2014]. The film was released just shortly before the release of her film Yasmine - Siti Kamaluddin's debut feature film and Brunei Darussalam's First International Feature Film.

Yasmine also won Best Asian Film at the Neuchatel International Fantastic Film Festival in 2014. It has also been competing in numerous film festivals worldwide including the Asia Pacific Screen Awards, Fantastic Film Festival, Puchon International Fantastic Film Festival and Hawaii International Film Festival (NETPAC Awards).

After a successful start with Yasmine, Siti Kamaluddin started the Brunei Film Blitz in 2017 with the hopes of introducing the Bruneian audience to World Cinema. In 2018, she directed her second feature film 'Hari Minggu Yanng Ke-Empat', a drama-comedy for Eid al-Fitr. The film receives the Special Jury Award at the ASEAN International Film Festival and Awards (AIFFA) and the Special Jury Award at the 59th Asia Pacific Film Festival in Macau.

In 2020, Siti Kamaluddin released her third feature film 'Akademi' which is a hit at the Brunei Box Office.

Filmography

References 

1979 births
Living people
Bruneian mass media people
Bruneian writers
Bruneian women writers